Dean Thomas (born 19 December 1961) is a Welsh former football player and manager. Thomas managed Hinckley United throughout almost the entirety of their fifteen year history and also managed Kettering Town.

Playing career
Thomas was a professional footballer with Wimbledon, Tampereen Ilves, Alemannia Aachen, Fortuna Düsseldorf, Northampton Town and Notts County. During his second loan spell with Ilves, Thomas won the Finnish championship in 1983. While at Notts County, he was club captain and played twice at Wembley Stadium.

Managerial career
His first managerial post was with Bedworth United, his hometown club.  In 1997, he became newly formed Hinckley United's first manager. He led the club to the Southern Football League Western Division championship in the 2000–01 season and the FA Cup second round in December 2001 and December 2004.

Thomas resigned as manager on 10 October 2012. In his 15 years with the club, he managed the club in 972 games.

Thomas took over as manager of Kettering Town of the Southern League Division One Central at the beginning of the 2013–14 season. He lost most of his first games, but eventually pulled together results, going 21 games unbeaten. The Poppies finished in 3rd place, thus qualifying for the play-offs. They beat Daventry Town 1–0 in the semi-final and progressed to the play-off final against Slough Town in the final. Kettering took a two-goal lead in the final but ultimately lost 3–2.

In May 2014, Thomas announced that he was stepping down as Kettering Town FC manager.

Personal life 
Since his absence from the football pitch, Thomas now sings covers of swing songs at local entertainment venues.

References

External links

1961 births
Living people
People from Bedworth
Welsh footballers
Welsh expatriate footballers
Expatriate footballers in Finland
Expatriate footballers in West Germany
Association football forwards
Wimbledon F.C. players
FC Ilves players
Fortuna Düsseldorf players
Northampton Town F.C. players
Notts County F.C. players
Bedworth United F.C. players
Hinckley United F.C. players
English Football League players
Bundesliga players
Welsh football managers
Bedworth United F.C. managers
Hinckley United F.C. managers
National League (English football) managers
Kettering Town F.C. managers
Welsh expatriate sportspeople in West Germany
Welsh expatriate sportspeople in Finland
2. Bundesliga players